Shelbyville Municipal Airport  is a public use airport located four nautical miles (7 km) northwest of the central business district of Shelbyville, in Shelby County, Indiana, United States. The airport is owned by the city of Shelbyville and is controlled by the mayor and an appointed Board of Commissioners. According to the FAA's National Plan of Integrated Airport Systems for 2009–2013, it was classified as a general aviation airport.

Although most U.S. airports use the same three-letter location identifier for the FAA and IATA, this airport is assigned GEZ by the FAA but has no designation from the IATA.

Facilities and aircraft 
It has two runways: 1/19 is 5,000 by 100 feet (1,524 x 30 m) with an asphalt pavement; 9/27 is 2,671 by 190 feet (814 x 58 m) with a turf surface.

For the 12-month period ending December 31, 2006, the airport had 24,094 aircraft operations, an average of 66 per day: 91% general aviation, 5% military, and 4% air taxi. At that time there were 60 aircraft based at this airport: 88% single-engine, 10% multi-engine, and 2% jet.

Military use
The airport is home of the headquarters of the 38th Combat Aviation Brigade (CAB), 38th Infantry Division, Indiana National Guard.

References

External links 
 Aerial photo as of 27 March 1998 from USGS The National Map via MSR Maps
 

Airports in Indiana
Transportation buildings and structures in Shelby County, Indiana